Elizabeth Anne Pelton (born November 26, 1993) is an American former competitive swimmer and multi FINA world champion.

Personal

Pelton is an American swimmer and multiple FINA World Champion. She has been competing against at the world's best since 2009, at the age of 15. Pelton grew up in Fairfield, CT and swam for the Wilton Wahoos before moving to swim at Badger Swim Club in Larchmont, NY under esteemed coach John Collins. In 2006, Pelton moved to Baltimore, MD to swim with North Baltimore Aquatic Club, one of the most elite swim programs in the world. She trained with Paul Yetter, as well as Bob Bowman, coaches who produced Michael Phelps and Katie Hoff, among the other multiple Olympians from that site. Pelton trained at the T2 Aquatics Swim Club in 2012 in Naples, FL, under Paul Yetter. After 2012, Pelton began her college career at the University of California Berkeley, swimming under the 2012 head London Olympic Swimming Team Women's coach, Teri McKeever. McKeever has produced multiple olympians, in particular, the most decorated female Olympian in history, Natalie Coughlin. Some others included are Dana Vollmer, Emily Silver, Caitlin Leverenz, Rachel Bootsma, Kathleen Baker, and Sara Isokovic. Pelton recently announced her official retirement from the sport at the 2016 Swimming Olympic Trials in Omaha, Nebraska. Pelton is a current student at UC Berkeley. Elizabeth comes from a swimming family with her older brother Gregory swimming for Harvard, sister Mary who swims for University of Virginia, and younger brother William swimming for North Baltimore Aquatic Club. Her father also swam for Pittsburgh and is an MD at Columbia Medicine School.

High school

At the 2009 U.S. Nationals and World Championship Trials, Pelton placed second in the 100-meter backstroke, 200-meter backstroke, and 200-meter individual medley, earning berths on the U.S. national team for the 2009 World Aquatics Championships in Rome.  Pelton opted not to compete in the 200-meter individual medley in Rome because of a scheduling conflict with the 100-meter backstroke, and was replaced by Ariana Kukors for the event.  Pelton also opted to swim the 50-meter backstroke at the World Championships.

At the 2009 FINA World Championships, Pelton placed sixth in the 200-meter backstroke (2:08.04), 13th in the 100-meter backstroke (1:00.51), and 22nd in the 50-meter backstroke (28.86).  Additionally, Pelton swam the backstroke leg of the 4x100-meter medley relay preliminaries, but the U.S. team did not advance to the final.

College

Pelton attends the University of California, Berkeley, where she joined the California Golden Bears swimming team in 2012. In her first season at Cal, she set the American record in the 200-yard backstroke, then bested her own record again at 2013 Pac-12 Conference championships (1:48.39), then breaking the national, U.S. open record at the 2013 NCAAs with 1:47.84. Elizabeth had an outstanding freshman season for the Bears, earning 2013 NCAA Swimmer of the Year, NCAA Swimmer of the Meet, Pac-12 Swimmer of the Year, Pac-12 Freshman of the Year and Pac-12 Swimmer of the Meet honors. In 2014, at the Pac-12 meet, earned conference titles in the 200 back (1:52.18) and on the 800 free relay; also third in the 200 IM (1:55.65) and sixth in the 200 free (1:45.12). At 2014 NCAA Championships, she was a member of Cal's NCAA champion 800 free relay at the 2014 meet; also was the NCAA runner-up in the 200 back (1:50.55), fourth in the 200 IM (1:54.80) and 12th in the 200 free (1:44.59). In 2015, her junior year, placed second in the 200 IM (1:53.80), fifth in the 200 free (1:43.44) and second in the 200 back (1:50.27). At the NCAA Championships meet, she helped the 800 free relay set an American record at the 2015 Pac-12 Championships with a time of 6:50.18, and was 2015 NCAA runner-up to Missy Franklin in the 200 IM (1:52.80); tied for fifth in the 100 back (51.67) and placed seventh in the 200 back (1:52.08). In 2016, her senior year, Pelton served as Team Captain, helping the Bears place 3rd overall at the NCAA Championships in Atlanta, GA.

A CSCAA Scholar All-American in 2014 and an honorable mention Pac-12 All-Academic choice in 2014 and 2015

School record-holder in the 200 back (1:47.84); top 10 in Cal Berkeley history in: 200 free (3rd, 1:42.13), 200 IM (3rd, 1:52.80), 400 IM (6th, 4:09.89), 100 back (4th, 51.26) and 100 free (6th, 47.78)

National success

At the 2014 Phillips 66 National Championships, placed third in the 100m back (1:00.76), fifth in the 200 back (2:11.99) and fifth in the 50m back (28.85), qualifying for the Pan Pacific team.
Finished second to Cal teammate Missy Franklin in both the 100 back (59.27) and 200 back (2:06.29) at the 2013 U.S. National Championships; also placed sixth in the 100m free in 54.65.
At the 2011 ConocoPhillips National Championships, won a silver in the 200m backstroke and a silver in the 800m freestyle relay.

International success
Earned a silver medal in the 100m back at the 2015 World University Games in South Korea (1:00.65); also swam on the finals relay for the U.S. 400m medley relay, which took the bronze; in addition, was ninth in the 50m back. Competed in two individual events at the 2014 Pan Pacific Championships in Australia, taking seventh in the 100m back (1:01.37) and ninth in the 200m back (2:09.95). 
Pelton captured gold medals as a member of the 400m medley relay and 400m free relay at the 2013 World Championships in Barcelona; also took fourth in the 100 back (59.45) and fifth in the 200 back (2:08.98). Pelton won a gold medal in the 400m medley relay at the 2011 World Championships, swimming the backstroke lead off leg. At the 2009 World Championships, placed sixth in the 200 back (2:08.04), 13th in the 100 back (1:00.51) and 22nd in the 50 back. Qualified to compete in the 200 IM but opted out due to a scheduling conflict with the 100 back. At the 2011 Pan American Games, won a silver in the 100m back and gold in the 200m back. Pelton won a silver in the 200m back in the 2010 Pan Pacific Championships. Pelton was on the USA's 2009 and 2011 Duel in the Pool teams.

Personal bests (long course)
.

See also
 List of World Aquatics Championships medalists in swimming (women)

References

External links
 
 

1993 births
Living people
American female backstroke swimmers
American female freestyle swimmers
Pan American Games gold medalists for the United States
Pan American Games silver medalists for the United States
Pan American Games medalists in swimming
Swimmers at the 2011 Pan American Games
World Aquatics Championships medalists in swimming
Universiade medalists in swimming
Universiade silver medalists for the United States
Sportspeople from Fairfield, Connecticut
Medalists at the 2015 Summer Universiade
Medalists at the 2011 Pan American Games
21st-century American women
California Golden Bears women's swimmers